Hans Tambs Lyche ( 21 November 1859 – 16 April 1898) was a Norwegian engineer, unitarian minister, journalist and magazine editor.

Background
Hans Tambs Lyche was born in Fredrikshald, in Østfold county, Norway. His parents were  Wilhelm Julius Lyche (1823–1905) and Adelaide Thomine Tambs (1838–1867). From 1876-80, Lyche took engineering  training at Kristiania Technical College (Kristiania tekniske Skole).

He emigrated to the United States in 1880. He initially found work on a railroad in Iowa. He lived first in Chicago, where he became influenced by liberal theology. In 1881, he entered  Meadville Theological School, a Unitarian seminary which at that time was located in Meadville, Pennsylvania.

Career
He  served as a Unitarian minister in Wisconsin and Massachusetts.  He held church services in English and lectured on Norwegian literature. While he lived in the United States, he also published articles in the Norwegian publication, Dagbladet, Nyt Tidsskrift and other Norwegian journals, as well as in certain American magazines. He argued for women's rights, universal suffrage, library services and electric railways. He believed more leisure time, greater social and technical progress would provide more time and desire for reading and education.

He moved back to Norway in 1892, where he founded the magazine Kringsjaa,  an international journal. He was a co-founder of the unitarian magazine Frie Ord in 1894, and edited the magazine for two years. He edited the magazine Norderhov, and from 1897 he was also subeditor of the newspaper Dagbladet. He edited Kringsjaa until his untimely death in 1898. After his death, two of his books were published with a foreword by the editor of Nyt Tidsskrift, Christen Collin (1857–1926).

Personal life
Lyche was married in 1885 in Janesville, Wisconsin to Mary Rebecca Godden (March 25, 1856– September 13, 1938). Hans Tambs Lyche died of tuberculosis at only 38 years old. He was the father of noted professor and mathematician, Ralph Tambs-Lyche, and through him the grandfather of Guri Tambs-Lyche.

Selected works
 Ny-Idealismen (1896) Fulltext: Internetarkivet
 Mirakler, kultur og religion (1902) Fulltext: Internetarkivet
 Lysstreif over livsproblemer (1903) Fulltext: Internetarkivet

References

External links
A Brief History of Norwegian Unitarism

1859 births
1898 deaths
People from Halden
People from Østfold
People from Wisconsin
Norwegian emigrants to the United States
Norwegian magazine editors
Writers from Massachusetts
Writers from Wisconsin
19th-century Norwegian journalists
Male journalists
19th-century Norwegian writers
19th-century Norwegian male writers